Bukit Batu is a state constituency in Johor, Malaysia, that is represented in the Johor State Legislative Assembly.

The state constituency was first contested in 2004 and is mandated to return a single Assemblyman to the Johor State Legislative Assembly under the first-past-the-post voting system. , the State Assemblyman for Bukit Batu is Arthur Chiong Sen Sern from the Parti Keadilan Rakyat (PKR), which is part of the state's ruling coalition, Pakatan Harapan (PH).

Definition 
The Bukit Batu constituency contains the polling districts of Ulu Choh, Bandar Ulu Choh, Kampong Rahmat, Bukit Batu, Ayer Manis, FELDA Bukit Batu, Ayer Bemban, Midland Kulai Young, Pekan Kelapa Sawit Barat, Pekan Kelapa Sawit Tengah, Pekan Kelapa Sawit Timor, Kampong Sri Paya, Kota Kulai, Taman Permai and Taman Puteri.

History

Polling districts
According to the gazette issued on 30 March 2018, the Bukit Batu constituency has a total of 15 polling districts.

Representation history

Election results

References 

Johor state constituencies